Air Somalia was a privately owned airline based in Somalia. It was the first private airline owned entirely by Somalis.

Overview
The carrier was established in 2001. It provided internal passenger and international services to destinations in Africa and the Middle East. Air Somalia is now out of service, and in 2002 its one Tupolev Tu-154 they had was stored and later scrapped. In 2002, Air Somalia reported it ceased all operations and has liquidated all of its assets.

History
Air Somalia was banned from flying to Somaliland in June 2001. It was suspected that the airline was practicing unsafe flights. Somali media accused the ban of being unfair, claiming that the reason for the ban was that the airline name included the word "Somalia" and possessed a Somali star. However, Somaliland Minister of Civil Aviation and Air Transport for Somaliland Abdillahi Duale disputed this.

Fleet

History
Air Somalia had only one aircraft, a Tupolev Tu-154, which had gone through three registration changes while it was owned by Air Somalia. The aircraft was manufactured sometime in the 1990s. It was owned by five previous airlines, Aeroflot, Latavio-Baltic International, Latavio, Tavria and Tavria Mak. It was finally given to Air Somalia on 21 December 2000. It was stored on 17 January 2002. The PlaneLogger website claims that the plane is being scrapped, and has not taken a flight since 2001. However, the aircraft was seen at Dubai International Airport on 31 October 2002, and again at Sharjah International Airport on 28 January 2003.

Registration changes
During its time with Air Somalia, the Tupolev Tu-154 has had its tail number changed four times. When the plane was delivered to Air Somalia, its registration number was UR-85546. On 21 September 2001, its registration was changed to ER-TAI, to later be changed back to UR-85546 on 3 November 2001. Its registration number was changed for the final time to ER-TAI on 30 December 2001.

Table

See also
Jubba Airways
Daallo Airlines
Somali Airlines

References

External links

Airlines established in 2001
Airlines disestablished in 2002
Defunct airlines of Somalia
2001 establishments in Somalia
Companies based in Mogadishu